This is the progression of world record improvements of the long jump M60 division of Masters athletics.

Key

References

Masters Athletics Long Jump list

Masters athletics world record progressions
Long jump